Andrée Bordeaux-Le Pecq (1910–1973) was a French illustrator.

1910 births
1973 deaths
French illustrators